Paul Schaal (March 3, 1943 – September 1, 2017) was an American professional baseball player who played 11 seasons for the Los Angeles / California Angels and Kansas City Royals of Major League Baseball.

California Angels
Schaal became the Angels regular third baseman in his rookie season in 1965. He quickly established himself as a slick fielding but light hitting player. Most experts feel Schaal would have won multiple gold glove awards had it not been for Brooks Robinson. But Schaal struggled at the plate, batting .224 in 1965 and .244 in 1966. When his average plummeted to .188 in 1967 and .210 in 1968, he was forced to platoon at 3B for the Angels with Aurelio Rodríguez, who was a better hitter.

In 1968, Schaal was badly beaned by José Santiago of the Boston Red Sox. He spent 12 days in the hospital afterwards and had balance problems after his discharge.

Kansas City Royals
After his subpar seasons in 1967 and 1968, the Angels left Schaal unprotected and he was drafted by the Kansas City Royals in the expansion draft of 1969. Schaal's career took off from there as he became the Royals' everyday third baseman. He posted batting averages of .263 in 1969, .268 in 1970, and .274 in 1971 (when he also tallied his career high in home runs with 11). After slumping to .228 in 1972, Schaal rebounded with his career high .288 in 1973.  In 1974, Schaal started slowly, batting only .176 in 12 games with the Royals. With future Hall of Famer George Brett ready to take over third base duties for Kansas City, the Royals traded Schaal back to the Angels for outfielder Richie Scheinblum. Schaal finished his career playing 53 games for the Angels, batting .248.

Death
Schaal died from cancer on September 1, 2017, aged 74.

References

Paul Schaal at Pura Pelota (Venezuelan Professional Baseball League)

1943 births
2017 deaths
Arizona Instructional League Royals players
Baseball players from Pittsburgh
California Angels players
Compton High School alumni
Deaths from cancer in Hawaii
El Paso Sun Kings players
Hawaii Islanders players
Kansas City Royals players
Leones del Caracas players
American expatriate baseball players in Venezuela
Los Angeles Angels players
Omaha Royals players
Quad Cities Angels players
San Jose Bees players